The 2009 Western Athletic Conference (WAC) football season was an NCAA football season played from September 3, 2009, to January 4, 2010. The Western Athletic Conference consists of 9 members: Boise State, Fresno State, Hawai'i, Idaho, Louisiana Tech, Nevada, New Mexico State, San Jose State, and Utah State. Boise State won the 2009 WAC title going 13–0, 8–0 in conference and were invited to play in the Fiesta Bowl, in which they defeated previously unbeaten TCU. Nevada, Fresno State, and Idaho also played in bowl games, the Hawaii Bowl, New Mexico Bowl, and Humanitarian Bowl, respectively. Nevada lost to SMU and Fresno State lost to Wyoming, while Idaho beat Bowling Green.

Previous season 
The Boise State Broncos went 12–0 during the regular season to win the conference championship and rise to #9 in the final BCS standings. With Utah of the Mountain West Conference being ranked ahead of them in the BCS, the Broncos missed out on the big money bowls and were selected to play #11 TCU in the San Diego Credit Union Poinsettia Bowl where they would ultimately lose 17–16 to bring their undefeated season to an end.

Other bowl-eligible teams in 2008 were Louisiana Tech (7–5), Fresno State (7–5), Hawaii (7–6), Nevada (7–5) and San Jose State (6–6). La Tech was invited to play in the Independence Bowl, where they won 17–10 over Northern Illinois. Fresno State was invited to play in the New Mexico Bowl where they lost to Colorado State 35–30. Hawaii was invited to play in the Sheraton Hawaii Bowl in its home stadium, where it lost to Notre Dame 49–21. Nevada was invited to the Roady's Humanitarian Bowl where they lost to Maryland 42–35. San Jose State was not invited to a bowl game. Overall, the WAC went 1–4 in their bowl games.

Preseason

Preseason poll 
The 2009 WAC preseason poll was announced at the league's football preview in Salt Lake City on July 29. Boise State was overwhelmingly selected as the favorite to win the conference by both the league's coaches and media that cover the WAC. Although the Broncos did not receive all first-place votes in the coaches' poll, their selection was effectively unanimous; league rules prohibit coaches from casting first-place votes for their own teams. Accordingly, Broncos head coach Chris Petersen voted for Nevada.

Coaches poll
 Boise State – 64 (8)
 Nevada – 55 (1)
 Fresno State – 45
 Louisiana Tech – 45
 Hawaii – 36
 San Jose State – 34
 Utah State – 21
 New Mexico State – 13
 Idaho – 11

Media poll
 Boise State – 519 (55)
 Nevada – 444 (3)
 Fresno State – 365
 Louisiana Tech – 360
 Hawai'i – 275
 San Jose State – 263
 Utah State – 170
 Idaho – 110
 New Mexico State – 104

Colin Kaepernick of Nevada was voted the preseason Offensive Player of the Year and Kyle Wilson of Boise State was voted the preseason Defensive player of the year.

Award watch lists 

Mike Iupati of Idaho was one of three finalists named for the Outland Trophy, won by Ndamukong Suh of Nebraska.

Kellen Moore of Boise State was named one of the ten finalists for the Manning Award, won by Colt McCoy of Texas.

Regular season 

The WAC has teams in 4 different time zones. Times reflect start time in respective time zone of each team (Central-Louisiana Tech, Mountain-New Mexico State, Boise State, Utah State, Pacific-Idaho, Fresno State, San Jose State, Nevada, Hawaiian-Hawai'i). Conference games start times are that of the home team.

Rankings reflect that of the USA Today Coaches poll for that week until week eight when the BCS poll will be used.

Week one 

Players of the week:

Week two 

Players of the week:

Week three 

Players of the week:

Week four 

Players of the week:

Week five 

Players of the week:

Week six 

Players of the week:

Week seven 

Players of the week:

Week eight 

Players of the week:

Week nine 

Players of the week:

Week ten 

Players of the week:

Week eleven 

Players of the week:

Week twelve 

Players of the week:

Week thirteen 

Players of the week:

Week fourteen 

Players of the week:

Records against other conferences

All-WAC Teams

First Team

Offense
QB Kellen Moore- Boise State       
RB Ryan Mathews- Fresno State      
RB Vai Taua- Nevada     
WR Austin Pettis- Boise State    
WR Titus Young- Boise State 
WR Greg Salas- Hawai'i    
TE Dennis Morris- La Tech 
OL Nate Potter- Boise State       
OL Andrew Jackson- Fresno State       
OL John Estes- Hawai'i       
OL Mike Iupati- Idaho       
OL Alonzo Durham- Nevada       

Defense
DL Ryan Winterswyk- Boise State       
DL Chris Carter- Fresno State       
DL D'Anthony Smith- La Tech      
DL Dontay Moch- Nevada      
LB Ben Jacobs- Fresno State        
LB Blaze Soares- Hawai'i       
LB Adrien Cole- La Tech  
LB Bobby Wagner- Utah State       
DB Kyle Wilson- Boise State        
DB Shiloh Keo- Idaho       
DB Davon House- New Mexico State       
DB Duke Ihenacho- San Jose State      

Specialists
PK Kevin Goessling- Fresno State
P Robert Malone- Fresno State
ST Titus Young- Boise State

Second Team

Offense
QB Colin Kaepernick- Nevada       
RB Jeremy Avery- Boise State      
RB Daniel Porter- La Tech 
RB Robert Turbin- Utah State
WR Seyi Ajirotutu- Fresno State      
WR Max Komar- Idaho 
WR Brandon Wimberly- Nevada      
WR Kevin Jurovich- San Jose State 
TE Virgil Green- Nevada
OL Kenny Wiggins- Fresno State       
OL Aaron Kia- Hawai'i       
OL Irv Stevens- Idaho      
OL Rob McGill- La Tech       
OL Kenneth Ackerman- Nevada       

Defense
DL Billy Winn- Boise State       
DL Aaron Lavarias- Idaho       
DL Kevin Basped- Nevada      
DL Carl Ihenacho- San Jose State      
LB Winston Venable- Boise State        
LB JoJo Dickson- Idaho      
LB James-Michael Johnson- Nevada  
LB Justin Cole- San Jose State
DB Jeron Johnson- Boise State        
DB Lorne Bell- Fresno State       
DB Moses Harris- Fresno State
DB Jonathon Amaya- Nevada         

Specialists
PK Trey Farquhar- Idaho
P Philip Zavala- San Jose State
ST Phillip Livas- La Tech

Players of the year

Offense
Kellen Moore- Boise State              

Defense
Dontay Moch- Nevada                

Freshman
Brandon Wimberly- Nevada

Coach of the year
Chris Petersen- Boise State

Rankings
During the 2009 season the only WAC team to be ranked was Boise State, who would finish the season ranked #4.

Bowl games

Attendance

Expanded WAC standings

References